Midtstubakken is a ski jumping hill which is part of the Holmenkollen National Arena in Oslo, Norway. It has a hill size of 106 metres, and a K-spot of 95 metres. The current hill dates from 2010, although the first hill at the area was built in 1927. The venue has a capacity for 15,000 spectators and was designed by Grindaker Landskapsarkitekter and Økaw Arkitekter. It is served by Midtstuen Station of the Oslo Metro.

History
The first hill at Midtstubakken was built in 1927, and was renovated several times. The normal hill jumping and Nordic combined for the FIS Nordic World Ski Championships 1966 and FIS Nordic World Ski Championships 1982 were held in Midtstubakken, as will they be for the FIS Nordic World Ski Championships 2011. The superstructure was demolished in 1992, although an all-new hill opened in 2010 for the 2011 World Championships. On 6 September 2010, Maren Lundby made the first jump in the hill, and landed on 87 meters.

Events

Ladies

Men

Photo gallery

References

Ski jumping venues in Norway
Sports venues in Oslo
1927 establishments in Norway
2010 establishments in Norway
Holmenkollen